Matheus dos Santos Miranda (born 19 January 2000), commonly known as Miranda, is a Brazilian footballer who plays as a defender.

Career statistics

Club

Notes

References

External links

2000 births
Living people
Brazilian footballers
Brazil youth international footballers
Association football defenders
Campeonato Brasileiro Série A players
CR Vasco da Gama players
People from Duque de Caxias, Rio de Janeiro
Sportspeople from Rio de Janeiro (state)